The 2022–23 season is the 98th season in existence of Olympiacos and the club's 64th consecutive season in the top flight of Greek football. In addition to the Greek Super League, Olympiacos are participating in this season's Greek Cup, UEFA Champions League. The season covers the period from June 2022 to late May 2023.

Players

First team

Out on loan

Backroom staff

Coaching staff

Transfers

In

 Total Spending: €17.85M

Out

 Total Income: €7.4M

Net Income:  €10.45M

Friendlies

Competitions

Overview

Super League Greece

League table

Results summary

Results by matchday

Regular season matches

Greek Football Cup

Round of 16 

Olympiacos won 6–3 on aggregate.

Quarter-finals 

Olympiacos won 2–0 on aggregate.

Semi-finals

UEFA Champions League

Second qualifying round

UEFA Europa League

Third qualifying round

Play-off round

Group stage

Squad statistics

Appearances

Goalscorers & Assists 

Own goals: 1

References

External links

Olympiacos F.C. seasons
Olympiacos
Olympiacos
Olympiacos